Ove Karlsson (2 August 1915 – 23 May 1982) was a Swedish footballer who played as a defender.

References

Association football defenders
Swedish footballers
Allsvenskan players
Malmö FF players
AIK Fotboll players
1915 births
1982 deaths
Footballers from Malmö